Lodhran is a city in Punjab, Pakistan.

Lodhran may also refer to:
Lodhran District, a district of Punjab (Pakistan).
Lodhran Tehsil, a tehsil of district Lodhran.
Lodhran Junction railway station, a railway station in Pakistan.

See also